Agence Nationale de l'Aviation Civile et de la Météorologie may refer to:
 Agence Nationale de l'Aviation Civile et de la Météorologie (Comoros)
 Agence Nationale de l'Aviation Civile et de la Météorologie (Senegal)